The Entertainment Software Rating Board (ESRB), the video game content rating board for North America, has issued an "Adults Only" (AO) rating for 26 released video games. AO is the highest rating in the ESRB system, and indicates the game's content is suitable only for players aged 18 years and over.

The majority of AO-rated games are adult video games, typically those with pornographic or strong sexual content. Three games have been given the rating solely due to extreme levels of violence: the canceled Thrill Kill (1998), the initial cut of Manhunt 2 (2007), and Hatred (2015). The only game to receive the rating for other reasons is Peak Entertainment Casinos (2003), which allows players to gamble using real money. Grand Theft Auto: San Andreas (2004) was temporarily re-rated from M ("Mature") to AO after a sexually-explicit minigame was found hidden in the game, but the M rating was reinstated after Rockstar Games patched out the content.

Self-imposed restrictions by publishers and distributors limit the availability of AO-rated games, thus the rating has been described as a "kiss of death" by journalists, and is considered essentially a ban. All three major video game console manufacturers (Nintendo, Microsoft, and Sony) prohibit AO-rated games from being published on their platforms. Steam permits them, but hides them by default. Most retailers refuse to stock them, and the popular video game live streaming service Twitch forbids streaming them. In light of these regulatory challenges, most AO-games have been released for personal computers, and nearly all erotic game publishers forgo the rating process entirely and sell on unregulated marketplaces.

Games released with an AO rating

Games that received, but were not released with an AO rating 
In some cases, a game that initially received an AO rating from the ESRB was edited prior to their initial release in order to meet the criteria for an M rating. In selected cases, an AO-rated game was cancelled prior to its release, temporarily received the rating post-release due to the inclusion of normally-inaccessible content that met the rating, the uncut version of the game was released at a later date with an AO rating, or an unrated or self-rated version, patch, or downloadable content (DLC) was released via a platform with more liberal content rules (such as Steam).

See also

 List of NC-17 rated films
 List of Hong Kong Category III films

References

 
AO
AO rated games